Netrin-5 (NTN5), also known as netrin-1-like protein, is a protein that in humans is encoded by the NTN5 gene. Netrin-5 is included in the family of secreted laminin-related proteins.

Function 
Netrin-5 functions are not fully clarified. However, it is believed to:
 Plays an important role in neurogenesis by controlling the development of dendrites and acting as a guide for axons.
 Regulates cell migration in the brain during embryonic development.
 Prevents motor neuron cell body migration out of the neural tube.

Clinical significance 
A recent genome-wide association study (GWAS) has found that genetic variations in HAVCR2 are associated with late-onset sporadic Alzheimer’s disease (LOAD). However, it's unknown how netrin-5 mutation contributes to disease.

Considering the role of NTN5 in cell migration, it is very possible that netrin-5 has an important role in human carcinogenesis, although currently no tumor type with NTN5 alterations has been identified.

References